WQTE (95.3 FM, "Q-95 Country") is a radio station in Adrian, Michigan, broadcasting a country music format. The station is live and local during the day on weekdays, and airs a satellite format from ABC Radio called "Country Coast-to-Coast" (known on air as "Today's Best Country") the remainder of the time.

The station originally signed on as WABJ-FM in 1976, nearly immediately becoming WQTE. The station's original format was beautiful music, changing to country sometime in the early 1980s.  The station remains co-owned with WABJ (1490 AM) and Hudson-based WBZV (102.5 FM). For several years, WQTE has referred to itself as "Q95 Country," presumably to avoid confusion with adjacent-channel WKQI 95.5 FM in Detroit, which called itself "Q95" for many years and serves the northeastern part of WQTE's listening area.

The WQTE calls were originally used by what is now WRDT AM 560 in Monroe, Michigan (later WHND and WLLZ-AM) from 1959 to 1974.

References

Sources 
Michiguide.com - WQTE History

External links
Q95country Facebook

QTE-FM
Adrian, Michigan
Country radio stations in the United States